Schicchi (died  February 1280) was a medieval knight of Florence in the thirteenth century.  His life, including his crime of fraud by being a talented imposter, is detailed by Dante in the Inferno, which inspired a Puccini opera and a later play.  Dante's depiction of Schicchi's eternal punishment with insanity in hell inspired a painting by Bouguereau.

Dante's portrayal 

There is not much historical information about him, but taking Dante's reference to him as a starting point, commentators have portrayed a biography of him that largely follows the passage of the Inferno – (Canto trentesimo, vv. 32-33 and 42-45).

Other views 

The question widely debated by the glossators, albeit with some differences but substantially the same, is that this Schicchi was famous for the imitations of people and that when the rich widower and childless Buoso died, he, at the request of his friend Simone Donati, Buoso's nephew, sneaked into the bed of the deceased shortly after his death and called a notary and dictated a will in favor of Simone, which was promptly ratified. For himself, it seems that he was entitled only one mare (quoted by Dante) which is an indication of the burlesque and novella character of what happened.

Works inspired by Schicchi 

Starting from this story, and with much lighter and more pleasant stylistic characters, Giacomo Puccini composed the comic opera  Gianni Schicchi, performed in 1918. Another famous play is the comedy Gianni Schicchi by Gildo Passini, which made its successful debut in Milan in 1922 at the Olympia theatre, staged by the Compagnia Talli-Melato-Betrone.

Bibliography 
 , Inferno, Rizzoli editions 2001.
  and Giovanni Reggio, La Divina Commedia – Inferno, Le Monnier 1988.
 Fabrizio Scheggi, Il Mugello nel libro di Montaperti, Borgo San Lorenzo 2016,

References

External links 

 Gianni Schicchi

Medieval Italian knights
Italian male criminals
Forgers
Characters in the Divine Comedy